Creigh Deeds was the 2009 Democratic nominee for Governor of Virginia. He has been a Virginia State Senator since 2001 and was the Democratic Party's nominee for Attorney General of Virginia in 2005. He announced his candidacy for governor on December 13, 2007, in an online video. His primary opposition for the Democratic nomination was former Virginia House of Delegates member Brian Moran and former DNC chairman Terry McAuliffe. Deeds won the nomination by a large margin, taking about 50 percent of the vote in the June 9, 2009 Democratic primary. However, Deeds lost the gubernatorial race held on November 3, to Bob McDonnell, 41.25% to 58.61%.

Background

Creigh Deeds had been a member of the Virginia House of Delegates from 1991 to 2001 and has been a member of the state senate since he won a special election in the 25th district in 2001.

Positions

Deeds cast himself as a centrist upon entering the race due to his stances on gun control, the death penalty, and gay marriage.

Key personnel
 Joe Abbey - Campaign Manager
 Brooke Borkenhagen - Communications Director
 Peter Jackson - Senior Communications Advisor

Primary campaign

Timeline

Deeds announced his candidacy in December 2007. He was quickly joined by Delegate Brian Moran who announced on January 3, 2008. Initially, Deeds had built up momentum, having lost the race for attorney general in 2005 by just 323 votes Deeds's strategy was to campaign to the governor's mansion through his position in the Virginia State Senate by proposing several favorable legislative actions including proposing a measure to give a $10,000 tax-credit to businesses that made "job creating investments" and supporting eliminating the sales tax on renewable energy purchases.

Deeds picked up several major endorsements early in the race such as The International Police Union and (then) Charlottesville Mayor David Brown.

Deeds, along with fellow gubernatorial candidates participated in the Virginia Capitol Correspondents Association dinner.

Deeds was prohibited from raising funds during the 2009 session of the Virginia General Assembly. In addition, it was difficult for Deeds to campaign as he was predominately on the Senate Floor a majority of the time during the session. Deeds returned to the campaign trail in March and began his "Commonwealth Conversations Tour". His campaign has made stops in Bristol, Roanoke as well as other cities.

Deeds announced his 1st quarter fund-raising totals on April 9, 2009. Due to the fact that Deeds participated in the legislative session, his fundraising totals were less than McAuliffe and Moran. Deeds raised approximately $600,000, compared to $800,000 for Moran and $4.2 million for McAuliffe. Deeds reported that he had $1.2 million cash on hand, compared to Moran's $824,000, and that 97% of his contributions came from in-state, compared to 90% for Moran and 18% for McAuliffe.

In early May 2009, Deeds laid off about five campaign staffers, in order to keep airing television ads. After the layoffs, Deeds had 25 staffers across the state and six offices in Charlottesville, Richmond, Hampton Roads, Roanoke, Southside and Northern Virginia.

In late May 2009, Deeds began gaining momentum, according to various polling results. This was due in part to the Washington Posts endorsement of Deeds on May 22.

Polling

In early results of the three polls taken of the primary race, Deeds had registered at third place. Deeds was also the only candidate prohibited from campaigning due to the January/February session of the General Assembly which took him off the campaign trail. The March poll by Public Policy Polling (PPP) showed Deeds at 15%, 3 points behind McAuliffe's 18% and 7 points behind Moran's 22%. Deeds had also led with independent voters 21%19% over Moran according to the PPP poll released on March 31, 2009.

During late May, 2009, several polls showed Deeds gaining ground. These include Survey USA showing Deeds at 26%.

The first time Deeds lead in a poll after Terry McAuliffe's entrance came on June 2, 2009, when PPP announced the results of its second-to-last primary poll. The poll showed Deeds leading with 27% followed by 24% for McAuliffe and 22% for Moran

Grassroots support
Deeds maintained thorough grassroots support throughout the 2009 campaign. This included ground support at debates as well a rallies and phone-banks throughout Deeds' campaign offices. Deeds maintained his campaign headquarters in Charlottesville where phone banking the campaign organizes phone banking and other campaign activities.

Deeds, like both of his primary opponents, also maintained online grass-roots support. Deeds offered blogger "badges" to identify blogger support for his campaign. Several prominent Virginian bloggers endorsed Deeds such as Kenneth Bernstein, Alan Zimmerman, and others. 

Advertising
Deeds campaign manager Joe Abbey announced the campaign's decision to go on air via email sent to supporters. This email also contained a link to see one of the ads as well as a link to donate to "Contribute... To keep Creigh's ad on the air" in his words. The same day, the Deeds Campaign announced their decision to purchase air time on four major media markets; Bristol, Richmond, Hampton Roads, as well as Roanoke, Virginia

The 2 campaign advertisements, entitled "Education Story" and "Most Qualified", both feature Deeds and others in front of a white background with a narrator discussing Deeds issues/plans.

June 9th primary

The State of Virginia held its primary election on June 9, 2009, with polls open from 6 am to 7 pm. Turnout was expected from anywhere between 185,000 to 300,000. Not Larry Sabato projected in Crystal Ball, Creigh Deeds winning the Democratic primary at 7:29 PM followed by FiveThirtyEight.com at 7:45, as well as the Associated Press around the same time. Deeds won handily, amassing approximately 50% of the vote to Mcauliffe's and Moran's 26% and 24% respectively. Deeds won in most geographic areas of the Commonwealth including winning Arlington over Moran 47%-37%, and winning Virginia Beach over McAuliffe 46%-33% Deeds won 10 out of Virginia's 11 congressional districts including the one held by Moran's older brother Congressman Jim Moran

General election campaign

Timeline
After gaining the Democratic nomination, Creigh Deeds appeared alongside Governor Tim Kaine and former opponents Brian Moran and Terry McAuliffe at a Democratic Unity Event. Deeds also appeared with fellow running mates Jody Wagner and Steve Shannon in Williamsburg, Virginia along with Senators Warner and Webb.

Throughout August, Deeds started a campaign tour entitled "Deeds Country" designed to garner votes from traditionally Republican swaths of the state. While this tour was praised by some like Tom Jensen of Public Policy Polling, it was scorned by several Democratic bloggers such as Miles Grant, who said "how many Obama voters are going to be fired up (ready to go) when they see Deeds driving a gas-guzzler down dusty rural roads?"

As the campaign headed into late August and early September, Deeds was shown to be further and further down in the polls with PPP (D) showing Deeds -7%, Rasmussen showing -9%, and SurveyUSA showing Deeds at -12% (see below). However, The Washington Post broke news of a graduate school Master's thesis written by Bob McDonnell calling working women "detrimental" to the traditional family and criticizing the "purging" of religion from schools. Deeds and other Democrats began attacking McDonnell on his thesis and several polls started showing the race tightening up. By mid September, Rasmussen Reports had Deeds behind 48%–46% while the Washington Post had him losing 51%–47% (see below).

However, Deeds' campaign failed to generate much traction and was criticized for going too "negative". Many prominent Democrats, close to the White House, criticized Deeds for allegedly running away from President Obama. With anonymous Obama administration officials bashing Deeds, for his lack of "coordination" with the White House and for straying from the favored campaign strategies of the President and incumbent governor Kaine, Deeds went on to lose the General Election 59%–41% to Bob McDonnell.

Fundraising

Polling

The first poll released after Deeds secured the nomination by Rasmussen Reports had Deeds leading Republic Opponent Bob McDonnell 47%-41% In the same survey, 42% said Deeds is more likely to win while 34% said the same about McDonnell.

A Survey USA poll released in July showed McDonnell beating Deeds 55%–40%. However, this poll was cited as inaccurate by several including Public Policy Polling, another polling firm.

Results
These results were current as of 1:30 PM Eastern on Thursday, November 17, with 100% of precincts reporting. McDonnell received the highest percentage of the vote for governor out of any candidate since 1961. He won the majority of the vote in all age groups and bested Deeds in both the Asian and White demographics by large margins.

EndorsersNewspapers The Washington Post of the Washington Metropolitan Area
 Bristol Herald Courier of Bristol, Virginia
 Martinsville Bulletin of Martinsville, VirginiaVirginia State Senators Senate Majority Leader Richard Saslaw (D) of Fairfax
 Senator Phil Puckett (D) of Lebanon, Virginia
 Senator Henry Marsh (D) of Petersburg
 Chairwoman of the Democratic Caucus Mary Margaret Whipple (D) of Arlington County
 Senator Chap Petersen (D) of Fairfax
 Senator Roscoe Reynolds (D) of Martinsville
 Senator A. Donald McEachin (D) of Henrico CountyVirginia Mayors Charlottesville Mayor Dave Norris (D)
 Fmr. Charlottesville Mayor David Brown (D)
 Fmr. Richmond Mayor Walter T. Kenney (D)Unions Fairfax Deputy Sheriffs Coalition
 Fairfax Coalition of Police
 Virginia Education AssociationMembers of Congress Virginia's 9th congressional district Congressman Rick BoucherGovernors Tim Kaine (D), Current Governor of Virginia
 Mark Warner (D), 69th Governor of Virginia
 Linwood Holton (R), 61st Governor of VirginiaPolitical Figures'
 Leslie Byrne (D), 2005 losing Democratic lieutenant governor candidate
 Terry McAuliffe (D), former DNC Chairman and Losing 2009 Democratic Gubernatorial primary candidate
 Brian Moran (D), former Virginia State Delegate and losing 2009 Democratic gubernatorial primary candidate
 Barack Obama (D), President of the United States

See also

 2009 Virginia gubernatorial election
 2009 Bob McDonnell gubernatorial campaign
 Creigh Deeds

References

2009 in Virginia
Democratic Party (United States) campaigns
United States gubernatorial campaigns
2009